The Kamloops Heritage Railway is a heritage railway in Kamloops, British Columbia.  The railway operates throughout the year running trains within Kamloops. The train is pulled by restored steam locomotive Canadian National Railway 2141, the "Spirit of Kamloops".

2141 was built in 1912 by the Canadian Locomotive Company, in Kingston, Ontario - built for the Canadian Northern Railway, prior to it being absorbed into the Canadian National Railway.  She is a 2-8-0, 'Consolidation' class of steam locomotive built for branch line railways.  Originally a coal burner, she was converted to burn oil in 1954, and retired from active duty in 1958.  2141 was sold to the City of Kamloops in 1961, and placed on display in Riverside Park until restoration work began in 1995.  The restoration was completed in 2001, and 2141 has been working for KHR from May until December each year since.  A second restoration took place from 2013 to 2015, with the engine running again in August 2015. The locomotive was featured in the movie Gold (2013)

Tickets for excursions are sold at the ticket office, located at #3-510 Lorne Street, right across from the old Kamloops railway station.

As of 2022 the Kamloops Heritage Railway was reduced to temporary static display. This was due to the increased amount of freight traffic. Mainly, the export of American coal through Kamloops via Canadian Pacific Railway to the Canadian National Kamloops North yard via the rail bridge over the Thompson River.

See also

List of heritage railways in Canada

References

External links
Kamloops Heritage Railway
footage of 2141 operating on Vancouver Island in 1958

Heritage railways in British Columbia
Transport in Kamloops